Elections to Babergh Council were held on 1 May 2003.  The whole council was up for election with boundary changes since the last election in 1999. The council stayed under no overall control.

Election result

|}

3 Independent, 3 Conservative and 2 Liberal Democrat councillors were unopposed.

Ward results

External links
 2003 Babergh election result

2003 English local elections
2003
2000s in Suffolk